Ça ne change pas un homme is a 1991 album recorded by French singer Johnny Hallyday. It was in late December 1991 and achieved success in France, where it debuted at a peak at #3 on the charts on January 1, 1991, and totalled 43 weeks on the chart (top 50). It provided four singles in France, including two top ten hits: "Ça ne change pas un homme" (#7), "Dans un an ou un jour" (#7), "Et puis je sais" (#16) and "True to You" (#18).

The music of "Dans un an ou un jour" was signed by Mort Shuman, a famous artist who was close to Elvis Presley. After Shuman's death on November 3, 1991, Hallyday put the recording tape of the song on his grave during the funeral. "Pour exister" and "Et puis je sais" was written by Patrick Bruel and these songs were covered live by Bruel a few years later at a concert in 1995 ("Pour exister"), then as duet with Hallyday during another concert, in 2000 ("Et puis je sais").

Track listing

Source : Allmusic.

Releases

Charts

References

1991 albums
Johnny Hallyday albums
Mercury Records albums